Liv-ex (London International Vintners Exchange) is a global marketplace for wine trading. It has over 620 members from start-ups to established merchants. Liv-ex supplies them with data, trading and logistics services.

The platform publishes the actual prices at which wines are transacted and contains around £100m of firm buying and selling opportunities in over 16,000 wines. All are available to trade in real-time. Liv-ex additionally conceived the Standard-In-Bond (SIB) contract to assure stock condition, delivery and faster payments and provide transport and storage.

The company was founded in 2000 by two stockbrokers, James Miles and Justin Gibbs. It started with a group of 10 founding members in London

Trading  
Liv-ex's global network enables members to trade with other merchants worldwide. Trading on Liv-ex is reserved for professional buyers and sellers of fine wine, and is standardized and anonymous. The total value of bids and offers on Liv-ex surpasses £100million.

Data  
Liv-ex data is based on the activity of over 620 fine wine merchants based in 47 countries worldwide. Their activity accounts for an estimated 95% of fine wine turnover globally. Trades, price updates, bids and offers are standardized, verified and published as tens of millions of historic lines, with thousands of daily updates of reliable, independent and trusted data.

The data is based on real merchant transactions, rather than advertised prices which can be inaccurate and out of date. Liv-ex data is regularly quoted by media outlets including Reuters and Bloomberg.

Logistics 
With operations across the UK, Europe and Asia, Liv-ex provides its members with settlement and transport services. All services are charged at a flat per unit rate (with no minimum quantity). All wine traded on the market passes through the Liv-ex warehouse in London. The warehouse is temperature controlled and highly secure. Wine stored in the warehouse can be traded on Liv-ex, without the need to be moved or checked again. Transfer of ownership can be instant.

Liv-ex Products 
Liv-ex has a number of online products.

LWIN
LWIN (Liv-ex Wine Identification Number) is the universal wine identifier. Liv-ex created it in 2011 to provide a standardized numbering system that is designed to avoid error in communication, transfer and referencing. It removes the need to rely on written descriptions and provides the key to establishing which item in one database corresponds to which item in another database, which is helpful in transactions between organizations.

The unique seven-digit numerical code is designed to quickly and accurately identify an individual fine wine product. It enables messaging between systems and over the internet, allowing the trade to share information more easily.

Each LWIN refers to the wine itself i.e. the producer, brand or vineyard. The first six numbers of the code represent each wine's unique identifier, while the seventh number is a “check digit” that minimizes input errors. Additional information including the vintage, pack and bottle size can be appended to the LWIN in a standard format.

The LWIN standards for including additional data are:

 LWIN: 1234567 – Example winery, Cabernet
 LWIN-11: 12345672012 – Example Winery, Cabinet, 2012
 LWIN-16: 1234567201200750 – Example Winery, Cabernet, 2012, 750ml bottle capacity
 LWIN-18: 123456720121200750 – Example Winery, Cabernet, 2012, 12 bottles of 750ml each. 

For Liv-ex, LWINs are a foundation for the fine wine Exchange, from managing and sharing price data to maintaining the efficiency of their settlement and distribution services.

Wine Matcher
Wine Matcher is a web-based, artificial intelligence tool that allows merchants to take lists and transform them into a standardized set of wine names and formats with unique IDs (LWINs). These IDs can easily be shared with other systems or entered into a database for comparison in a matter of minutes. It can also return the clean list with wine price data – such as Market Price or last trade – from Liv-ex.

In 2017, Wine Matcher was awarded ‘Supply Chain Initiative of the Year’ by The Drinks Business. The judges called it a “very clever innovation” that “has far-reaching and practical implications for the fine wine trade”.

Automation
Liv-ex Automation allows members to automate their interactions with Liv-ex.

The technology that makes this work is known collectively as APIs (Application Programming Interface). APIs allow Liv-ex's platform to communicate with merchants' system or website, without any need for human intervention.

Liv-ex provides its members with market analysis, including in-depth reports and market updates. They cover new releases in their News and Insights section, as well as weekly trade, and interviews with important figures in the wine industry.

Liv-ex also publishes annual coverage on the Bordeaux En Primeur campaign, as well as Power 100 – their list of the most powerful brands in the fine wine market in conjunction with The Drinks Business.

Liv-ex Indices 
Liv-ex produces a number of fine wine indices that track prices for given groups of wines.

Liv-ex Fine Wine 50 Index
The Liv-ex Fine Wine 50 Index tracks the daily price movement of the most heavily traded commodities in the fine wine market – the Bordeaux First Growths. It includes only the ten most recent vintages (excluding En Primeur), with no other qualifying criteria applied.

Liv-ex Fine Wine 100 Index
The Liv-ex Fine Wine 100 Index, which is available on Bloomberg and Thomson Reuters, is considered the industry benchmark. It represents the price movement of 100 of the most sought-after fine wines on the secondary market.

Liv-ex Bordeaux 500 Index
The Liv-ex Bordeaux 500 is Liv-ex's most comprehensive index for Bordeaux wines. It represents the price movement of 500 leading wines from the region and is calculated monthly using the Liv-ex Mid Price. It has been backdated to December 2003.

The index comprises six sub-indices: the Fine Wine 50, the Right Bank 50, the Second Wine 50, the Sauternes 50, the Right Bank 100 and the Left Bank 200.

Liv-ex Fine Wine 1000 Index
The Liv-ex Fine Wine 1000 tracks 1,000 wines from across the world using the Liv-ex Mid Price. It is calculated monthly and was rebased at 100 in December 2003. It comprises seven sub-indices: the Bordeaux 500, the Bordeaux Legends 50, the Burgundy 150, the Champagne 50, the Rhone 100, the Italy 100 and the Rest of the World 50.

Liv-ex California 50 Index
Liv-ex recently launched the California 50 index, which tracks the performance of the last ten physical vintages of Screaming Eagle, Opus One, Dominoes, Harlan Estate and Ridge Monte Bello.

Liv-ex Port 50 Index
In 2018, Liv-ex also created the Port 50 index, which tracks the price movements of the last ten vintages of the five most actively traded Port wines: Dow, Fonseca, Graham, Taylor and Warre.

The Liv-ex Classification

The Liv-ex Classification 2019 is a league table that ranks the wines of the world by their average trade prices on Liv-ex. Based on the transactional activity of the world's largest pool of fine wine merchants, it reflects the changing buying patterns of the trade today.

References 

Price indices
Wine industry organizations